The Guerrilla Army Of The Poor (EGP – Ejército Guerrillero de los Pobres) was a Guatemalan leftist guerrilla movement, which commanded significant support among indigenous Maya people during the Guatemalan Civil War.

Formation 


In the aftermath of the 1954 Guatemalan coup d'état a series of leftist insurgencies began in the Guatemalan countryside, against the United States-supported military governments of the country. A prominent guerrilla group among these insurgents was the Rebel Armed Forces (Spanish: Fuerzas Armadas Rebeldes, FAR). The FAR was largely crushed by a counter-insurgency campaign carried out by the Guatemalan government with the help of the U.S. in the late 1960s. Between 2,800 and 8,000 FAR supporters were killed, and hundreds of leftists in urban areas were kidnapped, assassinated, or disappeared. Those of the FAR's leadership that had survived this campaign came together to form the EGP in Mexico City in the 1970s. These leaders included Ricardo Ramírez (whose nom de guerre was Rolando Morán) and Julio César Macías (known as César Montes), both Ladinos, and a number of Indigenous Mayan leaders.

Ideology
The new group had several ideological differences from the prior FAR. The FAR had based its ideology on the foco theory of Che Guevara. Che Guevara believed that people living in countries still ruled by colonial powers, or living in countries subject to newer forms of economic exploitation, could best defeat colonial powers by taking up arms. Several of the new EGP felt that it had not sufficiently taken into account the racial discrimination experienced by the Indigenous Mayan people in Guatemala, and that this had limited their support. The EGP drew inspiration from the success of the Viet Cong and the North Vietnamese army in resisting U.S. forces in the Vietnam War. They saw parallels between Guatemala and Vietnam, in that both countries were largely agrarian, and they both saw a struggle between capitalism and communism, and both saw heavy intervention from the U.S. to protect its economic interests. As a result, the EGP decided to include civilians more actively in their projects and made non-combatants a part of the revolutionary movement. The EGP saw their role as not only incorporating the issues that the civilians were concerned about but also "instructing" them in their political beliefs.

Activities
The combatants of the EGP returned to Guatemala on 19 January 1972, and had added a number of recruits by 1975. According to EGP founder Mario Payeras, these included a number of Mayans, from several different tribes. The EGP made its existence public in 1975, by playing a role in the execution of two Ladinos who were seen as the "region's most notorious oppressors". At its height, the EGP had the support of 270,000 people across the regions of Quiché, Chimaltenango, Huehuetenango, and Verapaces, in the Guatemalan highlands. These supporters included students, poor Ladinos, and a large number of Indigenous people.

In early 1980, a strike led by the CUC forced the Guatemalan government to raise minimum wages by 200 percent. In response, the government intensified its persecution of its critics, culminating in the Burning of the Spanish Embassy by police forces. A number of countries, including Spain, broke diplomatic relations with Guatemala following this incident, damaging the legitimacy of the government, and giving the EGP a chance to intensify its military activities. The EGP released a document proclaiming that the burning was an example of the racial persecution of the Indigenous People and that the EGP's struggle was related to this. This intensification of the EGP's activities led to the Guatemalan army establishing a presence in the area, and using kidnappings and torture to intimidate the population. A declassified CIA document from late February 1982 states that in mid-February 1982 the Guatemalan army had reinforced its existing forces and launched a "sweep operation in the Ixil Triangle. The commanding officers of the units involved have been instructed to destroy all towns and villages which are cooperating with the EGP and eliminate all sources of resistance"

Civilian patrols formed by the army perpetrated further human rights abuses, such that when Guerrillas were offered an amnesty by the government in 1983, the EGP asked its local supporters to accept it. The ability of the army to suppress the local support of the EGP has been attributed to military aid given to it by Israel and Argentina, as well as by the U.S. government after Ronald Reagan became president in 1981.

Aftermath

CUC 
While Guatemala has made efforts to move beyond its past, the country still remains extremely divided. By 1984, the large-scale massacres were generally over, the army had set up new bases throughout the Mayan heartlands and had accrued unprecedented economic power through the seizure of vast tracts of productive land and a number of key state institutions. An organization the EGP used to mobilize supporters was the Committee for Peasant Unity (Spanish: Comité de Unidad Campesina, CUC). This group was launched on 15 April 1978, and was described by its founder Pablo Ceto as a convergence of the leftist insurgency, and the Indigenous People's movement. Though it had close ties to the EGP, it was its own distinct organization. The CUC works in over 200 communities and six micro-regions of the country to defend the land, water, and food rights of impoverished peasants in Guatemala, primarily in communities facing displacement or environmental damage by mining, dam, and industrial agriculture corporations.

URNG 
The URNG is an umbrella group of Guatemalan political and revolutionary groups that spearheaded peace talks that took place all around the world. The URNG started as a guerrilla movement and was founded on February 7, 1982 and became a legal political party in 1998 after the Peace Process which ended the Guatemalan Civil War. The primary function of the URNG was to support the leftist beliefs of the Guatemalan civilians and to negotiate peace with the Guatemalan government. The Guatemalan insurgents of the 1980s traced their roots to the 1944-1954 "decade of revolution." Today's guerrilla leadership claims a special tie with the "unfinished revolution" of President Jacobo Arbenz. While the URNG attempts to balance peace, Guatemala, still to this day suffers from extremely high levels of inequality, with the Indigenous populations suffering the worst. Despite representing more than half of the population and participating actively in the country's economy, the Indigenous people's political participation is not equitably reflected.

Peace Process 
While government-URNG peace talks took place across the world, the Guatemalan government weakened. After years and years of fighting for justice, the parties returned to peace talks facilitated by the United Nations in 1993, which were ultimately successful. The Commission for Historical Clarification, which was a group that was created to clarify human rights violations related to the thirty-six year internal conflict from 1960 to the United Nation's brokered peace agreement of 1996, was established on June 23, 1994, as a part of a peace agreement between the Guatemalan government and the URNG. At the end of 1996, the Government of President Alvaro Arzu Irigoyen, together with the URNG, with the participation of the United Nations as moderator and with the support of the international community, concluded a long negotiating process, by signing the Peace Accords. The URNG plays a current role in Guatemalan politics and is still active today fighting for equal rights. During the elections in 2011, the party entered into a political alliance with Winaq, MNR, the URNG splinter ANN and may other civil society groups to form the Broad Front of the Left. The UNRG is still fighting for political representation but is making an avid effort to be a part of political decisions and regulations.

Notes and references
Notes

Sources
 McAllister, Carlota (2010). "A Headlong Rush into the Future". In Grandin, Greg; Joseph, Gilbert (eds.). A Century of Revolution. Durham, NC: Duke University Press. pp. 276–309.
 Bahbah, Bishara (1986). Israel and Latin America: The Military Connection. Palgrave Macmillan.
 Jonas, Susanne (1991). The Battle for Guatemala: Rebels, Death Squads, and U.S. Power. Westview Press.
 Grassroots International. "Peasant Unity Committee (CUC)."
 Costello, Patrick. "Historical Background: Accord Guatemala." Conciliation Resources.
 Sanford, Victoria. "Between Rigoberta Menchú and La Violencia." Latin American Perspectives 26, no. 6, 1999
 Rotheberg, Daniel "Guatemala Memory of Silence", 2016
 Truth Commission: Guatemala, United States Institute of Peace, 1997
 Loding, Torge "Wahlen in Guatemala 2011: Präsident Colom hat sich verrechnet" Standpunkte (in German). Rosa Luxemburg Stiftung
 Guatemalan National Revolutionary Unity (UNRG)

Guatemalan National Revolutionary Unity
Guerrilla organizations
Guatemalan Civil War
Guatemalan Maya people
Paramilitary organizations based in Guatemala
1972 establishments in Guatemala
1997 disestablishments in Guatemala